The 1971 ECAC Hockey Men's Ice Hockey Tournament was the 10th tournament in league history. It was played between March 9 and March 13, 1971. Quarterfinal games were played at home team campus sites, while the 'final four' games were played at the Boston Garden in Boston, Massachusetts. By reaching the championship game Harvard was invited to participate in the 1971 NCAA Division I Men's Ice Hockey Tournament. Clarkson, however, was passed over with Boston University chosen instead as the second eastern representative.

Format
The tournament featured three rounds of play, all of which were single-elimination. The top eight teams, based on winning percentage, qualified to participate in the tournament. In the quarterfinals the first seed and eighth seed, the second seed and seventh seed, the third seed and sixth seed and the fourth seed and fifth seed played against one another. In the semifinals, the highest seed plays the lowest remaining seed while the two remaining teams play with the winners advancing to the championship game and the losers advancing to the third place game.

Conference standings
Note: GP = Games played; W = Wins; L = Losses; T = Ties; Pct. = Winning percentage; GF = Goals for; GA = Goals against

Bracket
Teams are reseeded after the first round

Note: * denotes overtime period(s)

Quarterfinals

(1) Boston University vs. (8) Rensselaer

(2) Clarkson vs. (7) Pennsylvania

(3) Cornell vs. (6) Providence

(4) Harvard vs. (5) Brown

Semifinals

(1) Boston University vs. (4) Harvard

(2) Clarkson vs. (3) Cornell

Third Place

(1) Boston University vs. (3) Cornell

Championship

(2) Clarkson vs. (4) Harvard

Tournament awards

All-Tournament Team

First Team
F Dave Hynes* (Harvard)
F John Halme (Clarkson)
F Joe Cavanagh (Harvard)
D Jim Higgs (Cornell)
D Steve Warr (Clarkson)
G Bruce Bullock (Clarkson)
* Most Outstanding Player(s)

Second Team
F Steve Stirling (Boston University)
F Jerry Kemp (Clarkson)
F Larry Fullan (Cornell)
D Bob Brown (Boston University)
D Ric Jordan (Boston University)
G Bruce Durno (Harvard)

References

External links
ECAC Hockey
1970–71 ECAC Hockey Standings
1970–71 NCAA Standings

ECAC Hockey Men's Ice Hockey Tournament
ECAC tournament